Antonio de Zayas (died 16 October 1582) was a Roman Catholic prelate who served as Bishop of Nicaragua (1575–1582).

Biography
De Zayas was from Ecija, Spain, and ordained a priest in the Order of Friars Minor.
On 19 January 1575, he was appointed during the papacy of Pope Gregory XIII as Bishop of Nicaragua and arrived in Nicaragua in January 1576. Suffering from ill health, he resigned as Bishop of Nicaragua on 8 March 1582 and died on 16 October 1582.

References

External links and additional sources
 (for Chronology of Bishops) 
 (for Chronology of Bishops) 

16th-century Roman Catholic bishops in Nicaragua
Bishops appointed by Pope Gregory XIII
1582 deaths
People from Écija
Franciscan bishops
Roman Catholic bishops of León in Nicaragua